Otruba (feminine: Otrubová) is a Czech surname. It may refer to:
 Jakub Otruba (born 1998), Czech racing cyclist
 Jaroslav Otruba (1916–2007), Czech architect

See also
 
 Votruba

Czech-language surnames